Vincent David Overson (born 15 May 1962) is an English former professional footballer who played as a central defender. He made nearly 600 appearances in the Football League for Burnley, Birmingham City, Stoke City and Shrewsbury Town over a 20-year career.

Career
Overson was born in Kettering, Northamptonshire, and followed his brother Richard to Burnley after playing non-league football with Corby Town and Long Buckby. He turned professional in November 1979 and spent seven seasons at Turf Moor making 254 appearances scoring seven goals. During that time Burnley suffered relegation three times whilst they won the Third Division title in 1981–82.

He joined Birmingham City in June 1986 and captained Birmingham to success in the 1991 Football League Trophy where they defeated Tranmere Rovers. After making 213 appearances for Birmingham in five seasons he followed manager Lou Macari to Stoke City with a fee of £55,000 being decided at a tribunal. He fitted in well with fellow defenders John Butler, Ian Cranson and Lee Sandford and in 1991–92 Stoke reached the play-offs where they lost to Stockport County although they did beat County in the 1992 Football League Trophy Final. Stoke won the Second Division title in 1992–93 after going on a club record unbeaten run of 25 games. Overson played in 52 matches in 1993–94 and 43 in 1994–95. After playing in the first 22 matches in 1995–96 he sustained a calf injury against Sunderland and was released by the club at the end of the season after making 215 appearances.

Overson then made a return to Burnley and also had short spells with Shrewsbury Town and Halifax Town. He played for non-League team Padiham in 2002 before managing them the following year. He then managed Ramsbottom United while working with Burnley's Football in the Community scheme and coaching at their Centre of Excellence, and in 2004 was appointed head of youth development and Centre of Excellence manager at that club. He left Burnley in 2012. He then joined Bury as head of coaching.

Career statistics

Honours
Burnley
 Football League Third Division: 1981–82

Birmingham City
 Football League Trophy: 1990–91

Stoke City
 Football League Second Division: 1992–93
 Football League Trophy: 1991–92

Individual
PFA Team of the Year: 1991–92 Third Division, 1992–93 Second Division

References

External links

Living people
1962 births
Sportspeople from Kettering
English footballers
Association football central defenders
Corby Town F.C. players
Long Buckby A.F.C. players
Burnley F.C. players
Birmingham City F.C. players
Stoke City F.C. players
Shrewsbury Town F.C. players
Halifax Town A.F.C. players
English Football League players
English football managers
Burnley F.C. non-playing staff
Bury F.C. non-playing staff
Ramsbottom United F.C. managers